Xanthoparmelia conspersa, commonly known as the peppered rock-shield, is a foliose lichen and the type species of genus Xanthoparmelia. It is widely distributed in temperate zones, and has been recorded from Japan, Europe, Africa, North America, and South America.

Taxonomy
The lichen was first described with the name Lichen conspersus in 1799 by lichenologist Erik Acharius. In its taxonomic history, it has been transferred to the genera Imbricaria, Lobaria, and Parmelia. It became known as a species of Xanthoparmelia when Mason Hale promoted that subgenus of Parmelia to generic status in 1974.

It is commonly known as the "peppered rock-shield".

Description
Xanthoparmelia conspersa has a thallus that is either tightly or loosely attached to its substrate. The thallus, which measures , is made of narrow lobes that are 1–3 mm wide, which are crowded and usually overlapping. The thallus upper surface often features isidia that range in shape from spherical to branched cylinders. The lower surface of the thallus is black, except for near the lobe tips, where it may be pale to dark brown. Rhizines are coarse, black, and simple (i.e., unbranched), with a length of 0.5–1 mm.  Ascospores are 5–6 by 9–10 μm.

Some secondary metabolites found in Xanthoparmelia conspersa include usnic acid, hyposalazinic acid, stictic and norstictic acid.

Habitat and distribution
Xanthoparmelia conspersa grows on rocks (on siliceous rocks, particularly granite), and is typically found in sunny habitats. It has been recorded from Asia (Japan), Europe, Africa, North America, and South America.

See also
List of Xanthoparmelia species

References

conspersa
Lichen species
Lichens described in 1799
Lichens of Africa
Lichens of Europe
Lichens of Japan
Lichens of North America
Lichens of South America
Taxa named by Erik Acharius